Tundla  Assembly constituency is  one of the 403 constituencies of the Uttar Pradesh Legislative Assembly,  India. It is a part of the Firozabad district and  one of the five assembly constituencies in the Firozabad Lok Sabha constituency. First election in this assembly constituency was held in 1974 after the delimitation order was passed in 1967. After the "Delimitation of Parliamentary and Assembly Constituencies Order" was passed in 2008, the constituency was assigned identification number 95.  The constituency is revered for candidates from SC community.

Wards  / Areas
Extent  of Tundla Assembly constituency is Tundla Tehsil; KCs Narkhi , Nagla Beech (V) & Pachukhra  of  Firozabad Tehsil.

Members of the Legislative Assembly

Election results

2022

2020

16th Vidhan Sabha

See also
Firozabad district
Firozabad Lok Sabha constituency
Sixteenth Legislative Assembly of Uttar Pradesh
Uttar Pradesh Legislative Assembly
Vidhan Bhawan

References

External links
 

Assembly constituencies of Uttar Pradesh
Firozabad district
Constituencies established in 1967